Mister RNB España 2022 will be the 2nd Mister RNB España pageant. The competition was held on August 6, 2022 at the Auditorio de los Jardines de la Cueva de Nerja in Nerja, Málaga. Manuel Ndele of Burgos, Juan Pablo Colías González of Valladolid, Miguel Ángel Lucas Carrasco of Toledo and Cristhian Naranjo Gómez  of Alicante crowned their successors at the end of the event. The winners will go on to represent the Spain at the Mister Supranational, Mister International, Mister Global and Caballero Universal.

Background

Location and date 
On 26 April 2022, RNB España announced that Nerja, Málaga, on the Costa del Sol, will host Mister RNB España 2022 from Sunday, July 31 to Sunday, August 7. During the week, all official representatives will enjoy various sights of Nerja. The Finals will be held at the Auditorio de los Jardines de la Cueva de Nerja on Saturday, August 6, at 10:00 p.m, with free admission.

Results 
Color keys
  The contestant won in an International pageant.
  The contestant was a Finalist/Runner-up in an International pageant.
  The contestant was a Semi-Finalist in an International pageant.
  The contestant did not place.

Placements 
Mister RNB España 🇪🇸 2022 finals was held in Nerja via RNB España official YouTube channel on August 6, 2022.

§ – placed into the Top 12 as the From the ground up challenge winner

Δ – placed into the Top 24 by fast-track challenges

Special awards

Official delegates
Contestants were officially confirmed to compete for Mister RNB España 🇪🇸 2022 during Imposición de Bandas which was broadcast live from Nerja, Málaga via RNB España official YouTube on August 4, 2022.

References

External links
 Official site (in Spanish)

Male beauty pageants